Don't Get Angry (German: Mensch, ärgere dich nicht) is a 1972 West German comedy film directed by Peter Weck and starring Uschi Glas, Beppo Brem and Georg Thomalla. It takes its name from a popular German board game.

The film's sets were designed by the art director Leo Metzenbauer.

Cast
Uschi Glas as Ulla Wendt 
Beppo Brem as Horst Vogel 
Georg Thomalla as Ewald Fröhlich 
Karl Lieffen as Max 
Chris Roberts as Thomas Conrad 
Christiane Hörbiger as Frl. Glöckner 
Corinna Genest as Mathilde Kühlborn 
Bruno Hübner as Clusius 
Max Grießer as Katzinger 
Klaus Dahlen as Alois 
Veronika Fitz as Frau Linsinger 
Hans Korte as Paul Wegmann 
Erni Singerl as Zenzi Vogel 
Margot Mahler as Frl. Quecke 
Bruno W. Pantel as Director der Milchfirma 
Willy Harlander as Ratzig, auto repairer
Erich Kleiber as Civil servant 
Veronika Faber as saleswoman
Otto Retzer as elevator repairer
Werner Singh as policeman 
Dagobert Walter as Will

References

External links

1972 comedy films
German comedy films
West German films
Films directed by Peter Weck
Films scored by Gerhard Heinz
Gloria Film films
1970s German-language films
1970s German films